The Evangelical Lutheran Church in Brunswick is a Lutheran church in the German states of Lower Saxony and Saxony-Anhalt. 

The seat of the Landesbischof (bishop) is Wolfenbüttel. Its district as a Landeskirche covers the former Free State of Brunswick in the borders of 1945. As of 2020, the church had 311,518 members in 300 parishes. It is a full member of the Evangelical Church in Germany (EKD), and is based on the teachings brought forward by Martin Luther during the Reformation. It is also a member of the United Evangelical Lutheran Church of Germany, the Community of Protestant Churches in Europe, the Lutheran World Federation, and the World Council of Churches. It is linked with the Church of England Diocese of Blackburn. Leading bishop of the church is Christoph Meyns (since 2014). The Church of Brunswick owns about 480 churches; the most famous of these is Brunswick Cathedral.

History

The Church of Brunswick originated as the state church (German: Landeskirche) of the Principality of Brunswick-Wolfenbüttel, where the Protestant Reformation was ultimately introduced in 1568. The ruling duke acted as bishop of the church. In 1704, Wolfenbüttel introduced religious tolerance, so that parishes not belonging to the state church could be founded. After the monarchy was abolished in 1918, the Church of Brunswick became an independent organization, but retained — like all former state churches — certain privileges. In 1922 the Brunswickian church counted 464,000 parishioners.

Practices 
Ordination of women and blessing of same-sex unions are allowed.

Bishops 
 1923–1933	Alexander Bernewitz (1863–1935)	
 1933–1934	Wilhelm Beye (1903–1975)
 1934	Oskar Evers (1889–1961)	
 1934–1947	Helmuth Johnsen (1891–1947)	
 1947–1965	Martin Erdmann (1896–1977)	
 1965–1982	Gerhard Heintze (1912–2006)	
 1982–1994	Gerhard Müller (* 1929)	
 1994–2002	Christian Krause (* 1940)	
 2002–May 2014	Friedrich Weber (1949–2015)	
 since June 2014 Christoph Meyns (* 1962)

Mission 
The Evangelical-Lutheran Mission in Lower Saxony (ELM), which was founded in 1977 as a common organisation for the Evangelical Lutheran State Churches of Brunswick, Hanover and Schaumburg-Lippe, looks after relationships with the overseas partner churches of the Brunswick State Church. The headquarters of the ELM is in Hermannsburg in the Südheide. Since 2003 Pastor Martina Helmer-Pham Xuan has been the director of the mission.

Notes

External links
 Evangelical Lutheran Church of Brunswick
 Evangelical Church in Germany EKD

Brunswick
Duchy of Brunswick
Brunswick
Christianity in Braunschweig
Brunswick church
Brunswick church
Brunswick
Brunswick
Brunswick
Brunswick
Brunswick
Brunswick
Organisations based in Braunschweig